Caroline Records is a record label originally founded in 1973. Initially founded in the United Kingdom to showcase British progressive rock groups, the label ceased releasing titles in 1976, and then re-emerged in the United States in 1986. The label released the work of American punk rock, thrash metal and new wave music bands. Caroline had a number of subsidiary labels, including Astralwerks, Gyroscope, Caroline Blue Plate, Beat the World, Scamp and Passenger. In 2013, the brand was relaunched by Universal Music via the Capitol Music Group.

UK label
The original Caroline record label started as a subsidiary of Richard Branson's Virgin Records from 1973 to 1976. It specialized in inexpensive LPs by progressive rock and jazz artists that lacked commercial appeal. Caroline Records rarely mentioned a connection with Virgin, and some UK and European Virgin albums that were distributed internationally (instead of being manufactured in each country) named Caroline as their American distributor.

The first release was Outside the Dream Syndicate by Tony Conrad and Faust in 1973. The logo was a photographic-style variation of Virgin's "Twins" logo, designed by Roger Dean.

US label
In 1983, the Caroline name was reused by Virgin in the US as the importer Caroline Distribution. Caroline Distribution founded the current Caroline Records in 1986. Some Caroline Records CDs issued in the US, bore the label name Caroline Blue Plate, especially Virgin UK originally-issued progressive rock records. Caroline Records was merged into Virgin Records after Virgin was acquired by Thorn EMI. Caroline Distribution was separated and became part of EMI Music Distribution. In 2013, the brand was revived by Universal Music Group under Capitol Music Group.

France label
Caroline France was created in 2014 by Thomas Lorain following a call from Caroline who wanted a subsidiary in France.

Caroline France renames itself Virgin Records France in 2021 following the launch of Virgin Music Label & Artist Services.

Primo Scree
Primo Scree was an imprint of Caroline Records created by Ned Hayden of the Action Swingers, who had previously been a sales rep at Caroline. Its releases included the Action Swingers' single "Fear of a Fucked Up Planet", as well as Gumball's debut album Special Kiss and Monster Magnet's debut album Spine of God.

Notable releases

 50 Cent – Animal Ambition
 Audio Active & Laraaji – The Way Out Is the Way In
 Kevin Ayers, June Campbell Cramer & Brian Eno – Lady June's Linguistic Leprosy
 Bad Brains – Quickness
 Ben Folds Five – Ben Folds Five (under Passenger Records)
 Harold Budd Reuben Garcia Daniel Lentz – Music for 3 Pianos
 Cabaret Voltaire – The Drain Train
 Cabaret Voltaire – Drinking Gasoline
 Cherry Poppin' Daddies – Kids on the Street
 Cluster – Grosses Wasser (CD reissue)
 Cluster – One Hour
 Lol Coxhill – Fleas in Custard
 Dumblonde – Dumblonde
 Drop Nineteens - Delaware
 Egg – The Civil Surface
 Beowulf - Lost My Head 
 Brian Eno – Before and After Science
 Eno Moebius Roedelius – After the Heat (CD reissue)
 Brian Eno & Jah Wobble – Spinner
 Excel – Split Image
 Excel – The Joke's on You
 Excel – Seeking Refuge
 Fred Frith – Guitar Solos
 Various artists – Guitar Solos 2
 Gilgamesh – Gilgamesh
 Gong – Camembert Electrique
 Gong – Angel's Egg
 Gong – You
 Goo Goo Dolls – Goo Goo Dolls
 Heatmiser – Mic City Sons
 Henry Cow – Concerts
 Hole – Pretty on the Inside
 Bat For Lashes–Two Suns
 Bat For Lashes – Fur and gold
 Idaho – Year After Year
 Idaho– This Way Out
 Idaho – Three Sheets to the Wind
 Jabula – Thunder into our hearts
 Killing Joke – Killing Joke
 Korn – The Paradigm Shift
 KT Tunstall - Kin (under Sony/ATV Music Publishing)
 Jayce Lewis/Protafield - Nemesis
 Mercyful Fate – Melissa
 The Misfits – Static Age
 Monster Magnet – Tab
 NF - "The Search"
 Oh Wonder – Oh Wonder
 Andy Partridge/Harold Budd – Through the Hill
 Primus – Frizzle Fry
 Smashing Pumpkins – Gish
 Southern Culture on the Skids – For Lovers Only
 Steven Wilson – To the Bone
 Suicidal Tendencies – Join the Army
 Suicideboys – I Want to Die in New Orleans
 Swans – Children of God
 Tangerine Dream – Livemiles
 Tangerine Dream – Pergamon
 Tony Conrad with Faust – Outside the Dream Syndicate
 Uncle Slam – Say Uncle
 Underdog – The Vanishing Point
 Various artists – Greasy Truckers Live at Dingwalls Dance Hall
 Van Morrison - Keep Me Singing (2016)
 Walt Mink – Bareback Ride
 Walt Mink – Miss Happiness
 Warzone – Don't Forget the Struggle, Don't Forget the Streets
 White Zombie – Gods on Voodoo Moon (cassette version only)
 White Zombie – Soul-Crusher
 White Zombie – Make Them Die Slowly
 White Zombie – God of Thunder
 Youth of Today – We're Not in This Alone

References

External links
Artist Shop Caroline Records
Caroline Distribution Official website
Discogs Caroline Records
Discogs Gyroscope
EMI Group Website links

Alternative rock record labels
American record labels
British record labels
Electronic music record labels
EMI
Jazz record labels
1973 establishments in the United Kingdom
Record labels established in 1973
Universal Music Group
Virgin Records